Feeling Free is an album by guitarist Barney Kessel recorded in 1969 and released on the Contemporary label. The album marked a brief return to the label before Kessel embarked on an extended stay in Europe.

Reception

The Allmusic review by Scott Yanow states: "Although none of the musicians was associated exclusively with the avant-garde (Elvin Jones came the closest but never quite embraced free jazz), they show the influence of the explorations of the era, using aspects of the innovations as a logical way to stretch the jazz mainstream. Fascinating music".

Track listing
All compositions by Barney Kessel except as indicated
 "Moving Up" - 5:14
 "Blue Grass" - 9:24
 "This Guy's in Love with You" (Burt Bacharach, Hal David) - 5:14
 "Blues up, Down and All Around" - 8:21
 "The Sound of Silence" (Paul Simon) - 7:39
 "Two Note Samba" - 4:55

Personnel
Barney Kessel - guitar
Bobby Hutcherson - vibraphone
Chuck Domanico - bass
Elvin Jones - drums

References

Contemporary Records albums
Barney Kessel albums
1969 albums